Brianne Siddall (born August 25, 1963 in Encino, California), also known under her stage names of Jetta E. Bumpy, Ian Hawk, Murray Blue, Jetta Bird, and Brianne Brozey, is an American voice actress. She is known for voicing Tommy Himi, Koromon, Keenan Crier, and Calumon in over a hundred episodes of the popular anime Digimon and its video games, as well as for voicing Tsukasa and Elk in the anime .hack//Sign and the .hack games.

Career 
In the late 1990s, Siddall, under the stage name Ian Hawk, was hired to perform as the voice of Yahiko Myojin for the Sony dub of the Ruroni Kenshin anime and OAV, which premiered in the United States under the title Samurai X. This initial attempt to market the series proved unsuccessful and the series was later re-dubbed by Media Blasters, who chose to hire Bang Zoom! Entertainment to redub the series. She also voiced characters for Pioneer and Bang Zoom! including Kunikida in The Melancholy of Haruhi Suzumiya, as well as Ruby and Rina in Saint Tail. In live-action voice-over, she voiced Impus, the infant version of the character Prince Olympius, in Power Rangers Lightspeed Rescue, and Circuit the robotic owl in Power Rangers Time Force. In addition, Siddall voiced Jim Hawking, the kid crew member in Outlaw Star, which had a run on Cartoon Network's Toonami and Adult Swim programming blocks, She also voiced main character Al Izuruha in the Mobile Suit Gundam OAV, Mobile Suit Gundam 0080: War in the Pocket. She provided the voice of the toy Sage of Fijit Friends.

Personal life 
Siddall married producer Deven Chierighino in 1987. In 2011, Siddall was involved in an accident on the set of NCIS: Los Angeles, where she worked as an assistant location manager. Siddall underwent surgery in 2015 to re-fuse portions of her vertebrae and the pain from the injuries and surgeries has made it difficult for her to speak. She has a grey parrot named Jetta. Prior to Siddall's accident, she was an active runner and participated in several marathons.

Filmography

Anime

Animation

Films

Live action

Video games

References

Bibliography

External links 
 Brianne Siddall at Voiceover Universe
 
 Brianne Siddall, Ian Hawk at Crystal Acids Voice Actor Database
 

1963 births
Living people
American video game actresses
American voice actresses
People from Encino, Los Angeles
People from Valencia, Santa Clarita, California
Actresses from Los Angeles
20th-century American actresses
21st-century American actresses
Loyola Marymount University alumni
California State University, Northridge alumni